Alisa Theresa Buchinger (born 26 October 1992) is an Austrian karateka. She won the gold medal in the women's kumite 68 kg at the 2016 World Karate Championships in Linz, Austria. She is also a two-time gold medalist in this event at the European Karate Championships, both in 2015 and in 2017.

Career 

She won one of the bronze medals in the women's kumite 61 kg event at the 2011 European Karate Championships held in Zürich, Switzerland. She won one of the bronze medals in the women's kumite 68 kg event at the 2014 World Karate Championships held in Bremen, Germany. She also competed in the women's team kumite event.

In 2015, she won the silver medal in the women's kumite 68 kg event at the European Games held in Baku, Azerbaijan. In the final, she lost against Irina Zaretska of Azerbaijan. She won the silver medal in her event at the 2016 World University Karate Championships held in Braga, Portugal. At the 2017 World Games held in Wrocław, Poland, she won the silver medal in the women's kumite 68 kg event. In the final, she lost against Lamya Matoub of Algeria.

In June 2021, she competed at the World Olympic Qualification Tournament held in Paris, France hoping to qualify for the 2020 Summer Olympics in Tokyo, Japan. She was eliminated in her first match. In November 2021, she lost her bronze medal match in the women's 68 kg event at the World Karate Championships held in Dubai, United Arab Emirates.

She competed in the women's 68 kg event at the 2022 European Karate Championships held in Gaziantep, Turkey. She also competed in the women's team kumite event. She won the silver medal in the women's 68 kg event at the 2022 World Games held in Birmingham, United States.

Achievements

References

External links 

 

Living people
1992 births
Place of birth missing (living people)
Austrian female karateka
Karateka at the 2015 European Games
European Games medalists in karate
European Games silver medalists for Austria
Competitors at the 2017 World Games
Competitors at the 2022 World Games
World Games silver medalists
World Games medalists in karate
21st-century Austrian women